Navy Blues is the fourth studio album by Canadian rock band Sloan.  Released on Murderecords in 1998, the album is slightly heavier than their two previous albums, showing an influence from 1970s rock mixed with their usual catchy, melodic, Beatles-esque sound. The album contains arguably their most popular song, "Money City Maniacs," which went on to be used in a beer commercial at the time. The song also became a top 10 hit in the band's native Canada and received heavy radio airplay. Navy Blues was certified Gold in Canada on June 12, 1998. By October 1998, the album had sold more than 70,000 copies. The album was nominated for Best Rock Album at the 1999 Juno Awards.

The album's cover art is a very direct copy of the movie poster for the 1959 Polish film Night Train (Polish: Pociąg).

Track listing 
All songs credited to Sloan.

Japanese Bonus Tracks

B-sides
 "Keep on Thinkin' (acoustic)" ("She Says What She Means" promo)

Trivia 
 "She Says What She Means" was the last song recorded for the album. Chris Murphy wanted to make a hard rock song because he was jealous of Patrick Pentland's rock songs "Money City Maniacs" and "Iggy and Angus".
 Murphy took the title of his song "Chester the Molester" from a name of a character in a Hustler magazine that his cousins used to call him. Murphy was reminded of the name by Mark Gaudet, the drummer from the Canadian band Elevator To Hell.
 The lyrics for "I'm Not Through With You Yet" were the original lyrics for "Worried Now" from Sloan's 1994 album, Twice Removed. Pentland originally titled the song with the words "Cotton Picking" because of its supposed "Southern feel", but changed it out of fear that it might be taken as racist.

References 

1998 albums
Sloan (band) albums
Murderecords albums